Medial plantar may refer to:

 Medial plantar nerve
 Medial plantar artery